Märta Elisabeth Rehn  (born 6 April 1935) is a Finnish former politician and diplomat. She served as the Minister of Defence of Finland during 1990 to 1995 and as an Under-Secretary-General of the United Nations during 1998 to 1999. She was also a member of the Finnish Parliament and parliamentary leader of the Swedish People's Party of Finland, and a member of the European Parliament.

Early life and education
Rehn was born on 6 April 1935 in Helsinki, Finland. She spent her childhood in Mäntsälä, where her father worked as a community medical doctor. Rehn went to a local school in Mäntsälä before entering a boarding school in Kauniainen.

Rehn received a master of science degree in economics from Hanken School of Economics in 1957 and has honorary doctorates in political science from both Hanken School of Economics and Åbo Akademi University and an honorary doctorate in military science from the National Defence University.

In the early 1960s, she was recognized as the first person in Finland to import and market plastic Tupperware containers.

Career
Rehn was first elected as a member of parliament for Uusimaa in 1979. She was the parliamentary leader of the Swedish People's Party of Finland from 1987 to 1990. 

She was appointed as Minister of Defence to the Holkeri Cabinet, succeededing Ole Norrback, in 1990. Upon her assumption of office on 13 June 1990, she became the first female defence minister of a European nation and the sixth in the world. When Esko Aho succeeded Harri Holkeri as Prime Minister of Finland in 1991, Rehn was retained as defence minister and, in addition, was appointed Minister of Equality Affairs in the Ministry of Social Affairs and Health. During her tenure in office, a law was passed permitting women to perform voluntary national military service.

Her popularity in office led to the Swedish People's Party candidacy in the 1994 Finnish presidential election. She earned enough votes in early elections to make it to the final round, in which she faced diplomat Martti Ahtisaari of the Social Democratic Party of Finland. She received 46.1% of the final vote.

Rehn was appointed a member of the European Parliament (MEP) for Finland during the 1995–1996 period of the Fourth European Parliament, a position established as part of the 1995 enlargement of the European Union. Her term began on 1 January 1995 and she remained in office until 10 November 1996.

On 27 September 1995, the Secretary-General of the United Nations, Kofi Annan, appointed Rehn as Special Rapporteur on the situation of human rights in the Republic of Croatia, FRY, Bosnia and Herzegovina, and Republic of Macedonia – collectively, the states comprising the former Yugoslavia. After several years as Special Rapporteur, she was appointed an Under-Secretary-General of the United Nations, with the specific assignment of Special Representative of the Secretary-General and Coordinator of the United Nations Mission in Bosnia and Herzegovina, an office she held during 16 January 1998 to 15 July 1999. While on assignement, she was one of the earliest observers to visit the mass graves of the Srebrenica massacre.

Other activities
Elisabeth Rehn and Lamija Tanović were the key founding members and patrons of the United World College in Mostar, Bosnia and Herzegovina. 

Rehn was a member of the Global Leadership Foundation (GLF) until November 2017. GLF is an organization which works to support democratic leadership, prevent and resolve conflict through mediation and promote good governance in the form of democratic institutions, open markets, human rights and the rule of law. It does so by making available, discreetly and in confidence, the experience of former leaders to today’s national leaders. It is a non-profit organization composed of former heads of government, senior governmental and international organization officials who work closely with heads of government on governance-related issues of concern to them.

Memberships and NGO positions 

 European Leadership Network
 Femmes Africa Solidarité, Advisory Board member, 2005–
 Finnish Red Cross, Vice-chair, 1984–1988
 Global Leadership Foundation, –2017
 Intellibridge, Advisory Council member
 International Court of Justice, Trust Fund for Victims, Board of Directors member
 Organization for Security and Co-operation in Europe, Court of Conciliation and Arbitration of the Organization for Security and Co-operation in Europe member, 1994–
 Regional Women's Lobby South Eastern Europe, Advisory Board member
 UNICEF, Finnish Committee member, 1982–1994
 Chair of the Standing Group of the National Committees of UNICEF, 1988–1993
 UNIFEM
 Independent expert on women's role in peace-building, 2001–2003
 Global study on the implementation of UN Security Council resolution 1325, High Level Advisory Group member, 2015
 UNIFEM Finland, Vice-chair of the Board, 2003–2005
 WWF Finland, Chair of Board of Trustees, 2000–2006
 Zonta International, International Honorary Member

Sources:

Works

Personal life
Rehn was married to Ove Rehn from 1955 until his death in 2004, and they have four children: Joakim, Charlotta, Johan, and Veronica Rehn-Kivi, a member of parliament.

Rehn is a two-time cancer survivor. She recovered from colon cancer in the 1990s and was diagnosed with breast cancer in 2000.

Honours and awards

Honours

National honours
 : Order of the Cross of Liberty, 1st class (2002)

Foreign honours
 : Order of the Cross of Terra Mariana, 1st class (2003)

Awards
   – Gold (see Axel Olof Freudenthal), Swedish People's Party of Finland (1994)
  Honorary Doctorate in Political Science, Hanken School of Economics (1994)
   (see Fredrika Runeberg), Swedish Cultural Foundation in Finland (1996)
  Sibelius Medal, Lions Club Jean Sibelius in Järvenpää (2 January 1996)
  Honorary Doctorate in Political Science, Åbo Akademi University (1998)
  , Evangelical Lutheran Church of Finland (2013)
  Honorary Doctorate in Military Science, National Defence University (2013)

References

External links 

 

1935 births
Living people
Candidates for President of Finland
Diplomats from Helsinki
Female defence ministers
Finnish politicians
Finnish women diplomats
Hanken School of Economics alumni
Members of the Parliament of Finland (1979–83)
Members of the Parliament of Finland (1983–87)
Members of the Parliament of Finland (1987–91)
Members of the Parliament of Finland (1991–95)
Ministers of Defence of Finland
Politicians from Helsinki
Recipients of the Order of the Cross of Liberty, 1st Class
Recipients of the Order of the Cross of Terra Mariana, 1st Class
Special Representatives of the Secretary-General of the United Nations
Swedish People's Party of Finland MEPs
Swedish People's Party of Finland politicians
Swedish-speaking Finns
Under-Secretaries-General of the United Nations
United Nations experts
United Nations special rapporteurs
Women government ministers of Finland
Women members of the Parliament of Finland
20th-century women MEPs for Finland